Prymorske is a village in Bilhorod-Dnistrovskyi Raion, Odesa Oblast, Ukraine. it belongs to Serhiivka settlement hromada, one of the hromadas of Ukraine.

References

Villages in Bilhorod-Dnistrovskyi Raion